The Condit House is the Official Residence of the President of Indiana State University. Built in 1860 and bequeathed to the university in 1962, it is the oldest building on the campus. The home, an example of Italianate architecture, was the private home of the Right Reverend Blackford Condit and his family from 1862 until 1962. Condit's youngest daughter, Helen, donated the home to the university upon her death.

In addition to its role as the Official Residence, it previously served as the University Alumni Center.

The architect was Jabez Hedden and the contractor was Lucien Houriet. It was listed on the National Register of Historic Places in 1973.

References

Houses on the National Register of Historic Places in Indiana
Italianate architecture in Indiana
Houses completed in 1860
Buildings and structures in Terre Haute, Indiana
Buildings and structures in Vigo County, Indiana
Houses in Vigo County, Indiana
1860 establishments in Indiana
National Register of Historic Places in Terre Haute, Indiana